"Super (1, 2, 3)" is a song by Italian DJ Gigi D'Agostino in collaboration with DJ Albertino. It was released in December 2000 as a single.

Track listing
 "Super (1, 2, 3)" (Riscaldamento) - 3:59
 "Super (1, 2, 3)" (Rassodante) - 8:11
 "Super (1, 2, 3)" (Idratante) - 7:14
 "Super (1, 2, 3)" (Rilassante) - 10:05

Name of song is Super (1, 2, 3), but it also known as "Une , Deux , Trois" and "Super (One, Two, Three)".

The remix song by Albertino also is in Gigi' Friends album (Riscaldamento version).

Chart performance
The song reached number one in Austria, number 2 in Italy and number 4 in Belgium.

Weekly charts

References

Number-one singles in Austria
Gigi D'Agostino songs
2000 songs
Arista Records singles
Songs written by Gigi D'Agostino